The Shire of Longreach was a local government area located in central western Queensland, centred on the town of Longreach, from which the shire was administered.

History 

The Longreach Division was created on 9 May 1900 under the Divisional Boards Act 1887, out of part of the Aramac Division.

With the passage of the Local Authorities Act 1902, Longreach Division became the Shire of Longreach on 31 March 1903.

On 15 March 2008, under the Local Government (Reform Implementation) Act 2007 passed by the Parliament of Queensland on 10 August 2007, the Shire of Longreach merged with the Shires of Ilfracombe and Isisford to form the Longreach Region.

Traditionally, a pastoral area, the shire increasingly became a tourist destination with attractions such as the Australian Stockman's Hall of Fame and the Qantas Founders Outback Museum.

Towns and localities 
The Shire of Longreach included the following settlements:

 Longreach
 Arrilalah
 Camoola
 Chorregon
 Ernestina
 Maneroo
 Morella
 Tocal
 Vergemont

Chairmen
1927: R. L. H. Peterson

Population

References

Former local government areas of Queensland
2008 disestablishments in Australia
Populated places disestablished in 2008